"Dandy Life" is a song by the American rock band Collective Soul. It is the sixth track from their fourth studio album Dosage.

Background
"Dandy Life" was written by lead guitarist Ross Childress, who provided lead vocals on the track. It was the first of two commercially released songs by Collective Soul that do not feature vocals from lead singer Ed Roland; the latter one is "I Don't Need Anymore Friends" from the album Afterwords (2007), which was written and sung by Childress' successor, lead guitarist Joel Kosche.

Commenting on the creation of "Dandy Life," Roland said:

Live performances
Collective Soul performed the song once during their Dosage Tour at the House of Blues in the Las Vegas Valley on September 21, 1999. It was also performed live at the House of Blues in Chicago on April 21, 2001.

Cover versions
Childress' group Starfish and Coffee performed the song live during their tenure as a band.

References

1999 songs
Collective Soul songs
Songs written by Ross Childress